Veldkampia is a monotypic genus of flowering plants belonging to the family Poaceae. It only contains one known species, Veldkampia sagaingensis Ibaragi & Shiro Kobay. 

Its native range is Myanmar.

The genus was circumscribed by Yasushi Ibaragi and Shiro Kobayashi in J. Jap. Bot. vol.83 on page 108 in 2008.

The genus name of Veldkampia is in honour of Jan Frederik Veldkamp (1941-2017), who was a British botanist and chemist.

References

Poaceae
Poaceae genera
Flora of Myanmar